Carmen Querida is a Venezuelan telenovela written by Alberto Barrera Tyszka for RCTV and broadcast in 1990. The telenovela lasted 167 episodes and was distributed internationally by RCTV International.

Marialejandra Martín and Carlos Montilla starred as the main protagonists.

Synopsis 
Three women, all blood relatives, share the same name and destiny. Through maternity, they come face to face with reality, broken romance - each without a mate.

Carmen Teresa, the first, has a life transformed by compulsive love that leads to abandonment of her family, with daughter Carmen Luisa in her arms. She is unaware that as the years pass the story will be repeated through her daughter. However, she remains loyal, ready and willing to offer love and advice to Carmen Luisa.

Carmen Cecilia is raised under her mother's strong, willful influence after Carmen Luisa's torrid romance with a syndicate leader. As a mother, Carmen Luisa is incapable of preventing her daughter from committing the same youthful errors.

In spite of the constant adversities of the two women who are the center of her life, Carmen Cecilia gives all her attention to Arturo. Desperately dominated by family situations, he leaves her. The product of their love will, in time, prove to be Carmen Beatriz.

Three women, three generations, one history that could have ended differently if only one of them had fought for her first love - for the father of her Carmen.

Cast
Marialejandra Martín as Carmen Cecilia
Carlos Montilla as Arturo
Marisela Berti as Carmen Luisa
Amalia Pérez Díaz as Carmen Teresa
Miriam Ochoa as Melania Ramos
Miguel Alcántara as Doctor Arcadio
Lourdes Valera as Hiraida
Vicente Tepedino as Padre Alberto
Ana Karina Manco as Carolina Arcaya
Carlos Villamizar as Elías Martucci
Marcelo Romo as Don Fidelio
Dalila Colombo as Doña Julia
Irina Rodríguez as Daisy Josefina
Jose Daniel Bort as Javierito
Laura Brey as Alma Santeliz

References

External links
Carmen Querida at the Internet Movie Database
Opening credits

1990 telenovelas
RCTV telenovelas
Venezuelan telenovelas
1990 Venezuelan television series debuts
1990 Venezuelan television series endings
Spanish-language telenovelas
Television shows set in Caracas